Prince or Princess of Asturias is the main substantive title used by the heir apparent or heir presumptive to the throne of Spain. According to the Spanish Constitution of 1978:

The title originated in 1388, when King John I of Castile granted the dignitywhich included jurisdiction over the territory – to his first-born son Henry. In an attempt to end the dynastic struggle between the heirs of Kings Peter I and Henry II of Castile, the principality was chosen as the highest jurisdictional lordship the King could grant that had not yet been granted to anyone. The custom of granting unique titles to royal heirs had already been in use in the Kingdoms of Aragon (Prince of Girona), England (Prince of Wales), and France (Dauphin of Viennois). The title, therefore, had two purposes: to serve as a generic title to name the heir apparent or heir presumptive, and as a specific title to apply to the prince who was first in the line of succession when the King transmitted to him the territory of the principality, with its government and its income.

After the formation of the dynastic union between the Kingdoms of Castile and Aragon under the Catholic Monarchs, the title was favoured by the Spanish King, who by custom applied it in the same way, i.e. to his heir apparent. For generations the kingdom's crown prince accumulated the titles "Prince of Asturias, Girona, Spain and the New World", modifying those of the earlier regnant Habsburgs: "Prince of these Kingdoms, Prince of the Spains and the New World" (Príncipe de estos Reynos, príncipe de las Españas y del Nuevo Mundo). When the Bourbons acceded to the Spanish throne in 1705, the title was retained following the decisive help of Castile to the house in the War of the Spanish Succession. At the beginning of the 19th century, the Spanish Constitution of 1812 (European year of revolutions) with consent of its counterparties ascribed the title to the heir of the Crown.  The Constitutions within the following decades temporarily removed the synonymy between the title and position as heir to the Crown; before being reinstated and recited in the second half of the 19th century, first half of the 20th century, and on the restoration of the monarchy (under parliamentary predominance) in 1978.

History 

The jurisdictional lordships, forms of governmentnot of ownership or possession, which were consolidated in the 14th and 15th centurieswere subrogations of the royal power for the administration of towns, usually those with geographical or structural difficulties that generated income. From King Alfonso XI the rulers created these lordships to give to their allies a proper way to maintain their position and to be able to govern and administer areas that were otherwise difficult to take care of with the traditional channels of the monarchy. From its origins, there have been buying and selling operations.

Origins: Counties of Noreña and Gijón

The origins of the Principality of Asturias can be traced to the counties of Noreña and Gijónlocated in the ancient Asturias de Oviedoterritories with seignorial jurisdiction that belonged to Rodrigo Álvarez, who was called "of the Asturias". These lordships were unique: they were territories that in remote times formed the Kingdom of Asturias, the one identified with the origins of the monarchy.

When Rodrigo died without an heir in 1333, he bequeathed his domains to Henry, Count of Trastámara and illegitimate half-brother of King Peter I, during whose reign a "true civil war"in the words of Luis Suárez Fernándeztook place in Asturias de Oviedo because a group of knights settled in small dominions believed that the consolidation of the "states" that were being occupied by the Count of Trastámara (in a civil war against the King), would affect their power. Henry, once King, ceded the counties to his illegitimate son Alfonso Enríquez. During the reign of his half brother King John I, the Count of Noreña and Gijón revolted against him several times; for this reason, the King decided to confiscate the counties and incorporate them to the Crown, promising in a document dated 18July 1383 that they would always remain part of the royal demesne.

Creation of the Principality

After the assassination of King Peter I in 1369, there began a series of disputes and long rivalries between John, Duke of Lancaster (who claimed the Castilian throne as the husband of Constance, eldest surviving daughter of King PeterI and his mistress María de Padilla but recognized as legitimate and in line of succession by the Cortes of 1362), and the two successive Trastámara claimants, HenryII and his son JohnI. After two decades of conflicts of varying intensity, the parties arrived at a compromise through means of the marriage between Prince Henry (son and heir of King JohnI) and Catherine of Lancaster (only surviving child of John and Constance). 

On 8 July 1388 the Treaty of Bayonne was signed between John of Lancaster and King JohnI of Castile, establishing the final dynastic reconciliation after the assassination of King PeterI. By this treaty, the Duke of Lancaster and his wife Constance renounced all their rights over the Castilian throne on behalf of the marriage of their daughter Catherine to the first-born son of King JuanI of Castile, the future HenryIII, who was granted as heir the dignity of Prince of Asturias. The title was granted with a ceremony.

The premature death of John I and the minority of HenryIII prevented the institutional and juridical conformation of the principality while Alfonso Enríquez rebelled again after obtaining his freedom by royal decree. Besieged by the King's troops, he submitted to the arbitration of King Charles VI of France, who imposed on the count the return of the territories he held in Asturias. The territory was subdued, and his royal status was confirmed.

In the early days of its creation, the title of Prince of Asturias was not just a simple honorific title, as it included control of the territory of Asturias. The Prince ruled it in representation of the King and was able to appoint judges, mayors, etc. King JohnII by decree dated in Tordesillas on 3March 1444 declared the conversion of the principality into a jurisdictional lordship, linking the cities, towns, and places of Asturias deOviedo with their rents and jurisdictions to the Majorat of the heirs of the Crown; however, this document was in some case disobeyed and ignored by the Asturian towns as it went against their traditional fueros. On 31May of that same year the future HenryIV tried to make the Majorat effective and remember Oviedo and the twenty-one principal Asturian villages that rightfully belonged to his lordship even though he had not "executed or used [the principality] because of my minority and the great debates and scandals that have taken place in these kingdoms".

With the legal conformation, the duality principality–lordship was recovered and would last under the jurisdiction of the Prince until the time of Catholic Monarchs, who limited the scope of the title, making it merely honorary; this decision was upheld by the members of the House of Habsburg and the House of Bourbon until the present day.

Although all the heirs of the Crown of Castile have traditionally been considered Princes of Asturias, not all had a formal act by which the jurisdictional lordship was granted; strictly speaking, the only Princes of Asturias were Henry, during 1388–1390, Enrique, during 1444–1453, Isabella during 1468–1474, and John, briefly during 1496–1497. In the periods in which no prince was proclaimed, the Principality did not disappear but was directly governed by the monarch, to whose treasury were sent the jurisdictional rents.

With the Catholic Monarchs, there began a policy of reintegration of the royal patrimony that gave rise to a long fight with the principality, lasting from 1483 to 1490, with the signing of an agreement by which the House of Quiñones handed over to the Crown the districts of Cangas, Tineo, Llanes, and Ribadesella in exchange for five million maravedis and the Leonese Babias. In 1496 there was an attempt to revive the principality by Royal Letter dated 20May, in which the monarchs, "wishing to observe the ancient custom" of their Kingdomsan allusion to Aragongave to Prince John the rents and jurisdictions of the Asturian places that had previously reverted to the Crown, reserving to them the majority of the judges and the condition of not alienating his patrimony.

Decadence under the Habsburgs

With Prince John the title was added to a list of titles used by the Hispanic monarchy, the heir adding the titles of Prince of Asturias, Girona (1496), Spain, and the New World. The imperialist aspirations are observed in the new title of the heir of the Catholic Monarchs: "Prince of these Kingdoms, Prince of the Spains and the New World" (Príncipe de estos Reynos, Príncipe de las Españas y del Nuevo Mundo). The title lives from that moment a time of partial decadence with the establishment of the House of Habsburg on the Spanish throne; for example, PhilipII was educated to take on the functions of Regent during the absences of his father, not like a Prince of Asturias. The 16th and 17th centuries were characterized by various conflicts between the King and the principality because of the titles and dignities granted and referring to the territory. Only during the reign of PhilipIV was a proper ceremony introduced for the Prince's oath as heir.

Absolutism under the Bourbons

With the arrival of the House of Bourbon to the Spanish throne after the War of the Spanish Succession begins a new period for the Principality of Asturias, whose population looked upon the new dynasty with hope. The new royal house promoted an identification of the Principality with the Spanish heir following the aid given by the Crown of Castile during the war, and the Principality of Asturias, which until then had been held by the heir of Castile, tended to be considered properly Spanish.

19th century Constitutions

Another period for the title began at the beginning of the 19th century with the arrival of the constitutional regime. For Agustín Argüelles, an Asturian deputy in the Cortes of Cádiz, the draft of the Constitution of 1812 preserved more by "custom than by utility or precision" the title of Prince of Asturias to the heir of the Crown. The commission responsible for the writing of the new constitution, equating the Crown Prince with the Prince of Asturias, proposed that the Cortes should recognize him immediately after announcing his birth and that upon reaching the age of 14, the prince should swear before the Cortes the defence of the Catholic faith, the preservation of the Constitution, and obedience to the King. During discussions, some deputies proposed that the Prince should be renamed of the Spains and not of Asturias, while others wanted him to use the dignity only after his oath and not from his birth. Besides Argüelles, the Asturians Pedro Inguanzo Rivero and Alonso Cañedo Vigil, each with opposing ideologies, defended, respectively, a title of honor or a title that was purely nominal, without royal rights but consecrated by history. The project remained unchanged and was finally approved.

The synonymy of the title "Prince of Asturias" with the heir of the throne was eliminated in the constitutions of 1837 and 1845, instead referring to the "immediate heir to the crown" (Article20 of the Constitution of 1837) and "immediate successor to the Crown", " immediate successor, "and" first-born son of the King " (articles 39, 47, and 61 of the Constitution of 1845).

The royal decree of 30May 1850 attributes to the "immediate successors to the Crown", according to the Constitution of the Monarchy, without distinction of men or women," the continued use of "Prince of Asturias". Queen Isabella II gave birth to a daughter, Isabella, on 20 December 1851 and as a result of this decree, the newborn received the title of "Princess of Asturias". Isabella would lose this title with the birth of her brother, the future Alfonso XII, in 1857.

The Constitution of 1869 kept the traditional denomination of Prince of Asturias due to the influence of the Asturian politician José Posada Herrera. Alfonso XII ascended the throne in 1874 following the end of the brief First Spanish Republic and as the infanta Isabella was the immediate heir to the Crown after her brother Alfonso, she once again became "Princess of Asturias" by royal order of 25March 1875, applying the doctrine of 1850 by granting the title of Princess without distinguishing between male or female successor. The subsequent Constitution of 1876 omitted the title again from its provisions, similar to the constitutions of 1837 and 1845.

Alfonso's wife, Maria Christina of Austria, was expecting a child with many hoping for a male heir. A new decree dated 1August 1880, established the ceremony for the presentation of the "Prince or Infanta" as Maria Christina was close to giving birth; the decision to formally establish the title was immediately appealed by a commission of the Provincial Delegation of Oviedo, which asked for the return of the title based on the validity of the decree of 1850. The decree establishing the ceremony for the presentation of the child was published in the Gazette of Madrid of 1September 1880, in which the heir was referred to as Prince of Asturias.

The royal decree of 22 August 1880 tried to clarify all the confusion and established the titles and honors of the Prince and Infantes. It was preceded by a statement of reasons in which the head of government Antonio Cánovas del Castillo, who was also a historian, sought to establish the true profile of the institution, arguing that there was an "unnecessary and inaccurate" confusion between the right of succession and the title of Prince of Asturias, that the Castilian investiture of the Principality of Asturias should not be confused with the succession to the Spanish Crown, that the single denomination of "Prince" or "Prince of these Kingdoms" be reserved, and that the legislators of Cádiz had exceeded their functions, sowing confusion in the constitutional articles. The decree established that the title had not been a creation of the Cortes, but of the King's will, and restored the "secular uses", maintaining the title of Prince for the first-born sons of the monarch, using the denomination of Asturias. The decree stated that any other immediate successor, male or female, had to be granted the title.

Maria Christina gave birth to a girl on 11 September 1880, to much disappointment, and the infant was initially treated only as an infanta. Cánovas, who wanted the crown to pass to a male, ignored the baby. After considerable criticism, the new liberal government of Práxedes Mateo Sagasta was limited to restoring the principles of the decree of 1850, granting the title of Princess of Asturias to Infanta María de las Mercedes in a royal decree dated 10March 1881.

Current democracy

With the restoration of the monarchy in 1975, the Royal Decree of 21January 1977, supported by the Provincial Delegation of Oviedo, ordered that the son of King Juan Carlos I, Prince Felipe, bear the title of Prince of Asturias, in addition to those titles traditionally appertaining to the heir of the throne. The process culminated in the promulgation of the Constitution of 1978, whose article57 says that the Crown Prince will be Prince of Asturias and can use the other titles linked to his person, symbolically embodying the Spanish dynastic union.

Titles and functions

The Prince of Asturias, as Crown prince, is the first in the Line of succession to the Spanish throne, receives the treatment of Royal Highness by Royal Decree 1368/1987 and holds the titles inherent to that position, recognized in the article57.1 of the Constitution, and which symbolize the Spanish dynastic union. In addition to the principal of Prince of Asturias (as heir of the Crown of Castile), the heir also has the following titles:

 Prince of Girona, Duke of Montblanc, Count of Cervera, and Lord of Balaguer as the heir of the Crown of Aragon, with origins in 1351, 1387, 1353, and 1418, respectively.
 Prince of Viana, as the heir of Kingdom of Navarre, with origin in 1424.

He also presides over the Princess of Asturias and Princess de Girona Foundations, named Prince of Asturias and Prince of Girona when the heir is male.

Upon reaching the age of majority, she or he must take an oath before the Cortes Generales to faithfully carry out her duties, to keep and enforce the Constitution and laws, and to respect the rights of citizens and autonomous communities, as well as show fidelity to the King, according to Article61 of the constitution. This procedure was introduced in 1978 since, before the promulgation of this constitution, the Princes of Asturias had to receive the oath of allegiance from the Cortes. The current titular of the Principality is Leonor, who took that dignity on 19June 2014, when her father, King Felipe VI, ascended to the throne following the abdication of her grandfather King Juan Carlos I.

List 

Following is a list of the Princes of Asturias from the creation of the title in 1388, as dignity of the heir of the Crown of Castile, until today, when it has been incorporated to the set of titles historically linked to the crown prince of Spain as the main one of them:

See also

Asturias
Asturias, Cebu, Philippines
Prince of Spain
Princess of Asturias (by marriage)
Monarchy of Spain
Prince of Asturias Awards
Príncipe de Asturias Peak
Spanish aircraft carrier Príncipe de Asturias
List of titles and honours of the Spanish Crown

Notes

References

Bibliography

 
 
 
 
 
 
 
 , n° XII.

External links
 The title of Prince of Asturias (in Spanish) abc.es
 La Numeración de los Principes de Astrurias

 
Heirs to the throne
Asturias
Asturias